John Emmet French (November 22, 1886 – June 10, 1947) was an American professional golfer, who is notable for losing to Gene Sarazen in the 1922 PGA Championship.

French was born in Bryn Mawr, Pennsylvania. French, being a tall man, was a good iron player.  He was known for playing entire rounds and matches without ever using a wooden club. 

French won three PGA events.

Professional wins

PGA Tour wins
1919 Philadelphia Open Championship
1924 Pennsylvania Open Championship, Ohio Open

Other wins
Note: This list may be incomplete
1926 Philadelphia Open Championship

Results in major championships

NYF = Tournament not yet founded
NT = No tournament
DNP = Did not play
WD = Withdrew
R32, R16, QF, SF = Round in which player lost in PGA Championship match play 
"T" indicates a tie for a place
Yellow background for top-10

Summary

Most consecutive cuts made – 19 (1915 U.S. Open – 1929 U.S. Open)
Longest streak of top-10s – 2 (twice)

References

American male golfers
PGA Tour golfers
Golfers from Pennsylvania
People from Bryn Mawr, Pennsylvania
1886 births
1947 deaths